The Miani Sahib Graveyard (Punjabi) is the largest graveyard in the city of Lahore, Pakistan. It is in the centre of Lahore. Its origins date back to the Mughal era, making it one of the oldest graveyards in the region.

Miani Sahib Graveyard occupies around 1,206 Kanal (60 hectares, 149 acres) of land and has a capacity of approximately 300,000 graves. It is administered by the Miani Sahib Graveyard Committee (MSGC), which was formed on 31 May 1962.

Gravediggers at the cemetery routinely bury the bodies of the newly deceased in plots that go unvisited.

Notable interments
 Dulla Bhatti (Rai Abdullah Bhatti)
 Ghazi Ilm-ud-din Shaheed
 Saghar Siddiqui
 Hakim Ahmad Shuja
 Anwar Kamal Pasha
 Khwaja Khurshid Anwar 
 Major Shabbir Sharif Shaheed 
 Saadat Hassan Manto
 Agha Hashar Kashmiri
 Wasif Ali Wasif
 Syed Wajid Ali
 Ihsan Danish
 Muhammad Pervaiz Malik

See also
 List of cemeteries in Pakistan
 List of cemeteries in Karachi
 List of cemeteries in Lahore

References

External links

 

Cemeteries in Lahore